Fredericksburg is an unincorporated community in Posey Township, Washington County, in the U.S. state of Indiana. The population was 85 at the 2010 census, at the time it was a town.

History
Fredericksburg was laid out in 1815. It was named for Frederick Royse, the original owner of the town site. Fredericksburg was incorporated as a town in 1859. The town disincorporated in June 2012.

The Fredericksburg post office has been in operation since 1819.

Geography
Fredericksburg is located at  (38.432609, -86.190128).   It is located on the Blue River, just downriver from the confluence of its North and South Forks.  The river was a valuable resource in the town's beginning as the construction of a water mill brought growth and prosperity to the town. As electricity nullified the need to be located near water, the river became a liability.  The town, located on a floodplain, is prone to flooding.  The frequent flooding pushed the town into decline, encouraging many residents and businesses to flee the town or move to higher land.

Demographics

2010 census
As of the census of 2010, there were 85 people, 35 households, and 22 families living in the town. The racial makeup of the town was 92.9% White, 2.4% Native American, and 4.7% from two or more races. Hispanic or Latino of any race were 5.9% of the population.

There were 35 households, of which 34.3% had children under the age of 18 living with them, 40.0% were married couples living together, 17.1% had a female householder with no husband present, 5.7% had a male householder with no wife present, and 37.1% were non-families. 37.1% of all households were made up of individuals, and 20% had someone living alone who was 65 years of age or older. The average household size was 2.43 and the average family size was 3.18.

The median age in the town was 33.3 years. 29.4% of residents were under the age of 18; 8.3% were between the ages of 18 and 24; 28.2% were from 25 to 44; 17.7% were from 45 to 64; and 16.5% were 65 years of age or older. The gender makeup of the town was 55.3% male and 44.7% female.

2000 census
As of the census of 2000, there were 92 people, 41 households, and 25 families living in the town. The racial makeup of the town was 100.00% White. Hispanic or Latino of any race were 1.09% of the population.

There were 41 households, out of which 29.3% had children under the age of 18 living with them, 43.9% were married couples living together, 12.2% had a female householder with no husband present, and 36.6% were non-families. 31.7% of all households were made up of individuals, and 9.8% had someone living alone who was 65 years of age or older. The average household size was 2.24 and the average family size was 2.77.

In the town, the population was spread out, with 21.7% under the age of 18, 8.7% from 18 to 24, 34.8% from 25 to 44, 17.4% from 45 to 64, and 17.4% who were 65 years of age or older. The median age was 39 years. For every 100 females, there were 109.1 males. For every 100 females age 18 and over, there were 100.0 males.

The median income for a household in the town was $21,250, and the median income for a family was $31,563. Males had a median income of $25,000 versus $35,250 for females. The per capita income for the town was $10,626. There were 21.4% of families and 23.5% of the population living below the poverty line, including 19.0% of under eighteens and 23.1% of those over 64.

Notable people

 Nathan Kimball, physician, politician, postmaster, and military officer.
 E. Howard Cadle, businessman, speaker, evangelist

References

Towns in Washington County, Indiana
Populated places established in 1815
1815 establishments in Indiana Territory
Former municipalities in Indiana
Populated places disestablished in 2012
2012 disestablishments in Indiana